Jadwiga Józefa Konik-Klimaj-Kowalczuk (6 October 1931 – 9 July 1998) was a Polish athlete. She competed in the women's shot put at the 1960 Summer Olympics.

References

External links
 

1931 births
1998 deaths
Athletes (track and field) at the 1960 Summer Olympics
Polish female shot putters
Olympic athletes of Poland
Sportspeople from Kraków